These 112 genera belong to Cicadettini, a tribe of cicadas in the family Cicadidae. There are at least 520 described species in Cicadettini.

Cicadettini genera

 †Paleopsalta Moulds, 2018
 Adelia Moulds, 2012
 Aestuansella Boulard, 1981
 Amphipsalta Fleming, 1969
 Atrapsalta Owen & Moulds, 2016
 Auscala Moulds, 2012
 Auta Distant, 1897
 Berberigetta Costa, Nunes, Marabuto, Mendes & Simões, 2017
 Birrima Distant, 1906
 Bispinalta Delorme, 2017
 Buyisa Distant, 1907
 Caledopsalta Delorme, 2017
 Caliginopsalta Ewart, 2005
 Chelapsalta Moulds, 2012
 Cicadetta Kolenati, 1857  (small grass cicadas)
 Cicadettana Marshall & Hill, 2017
 Clinata Moulds, 2012
 Clinopsalta Moulds, 2012
 Crotopsalta Ewart, 2005
 Curvicicada Chou & Lu, 1997
 Diemeniana Distant, 1906
 Dimissalna Boulard, 2007
 Dipsopsalta Moulds, 2012
 Drymopsalta Ewart, 2005
 Erempsalta Moulds, 2012
 Euboeana Gogala, Trilar & Drosopoulos, 2011
 Euryphara Horváth, 1912
 Ewartia Moulds, 2012
 Falcatpsalta Owen & Moulds, 2016
 Fijipsalta Duffels, 1988
 Froggattoides Distant, 1910
 Gagatopsalta Ewart, 2005
 Galanga Moulds, 2012
 Gelidea Moulds, 2012
 Germalna Delorme
 Ggomapsalta Lee, 2009
 Graminitigrina Ewart & Marques, 2008
 Graptotettix Stål, 1866
 Gudanga Distant, 1905
 Haemopsalta Owen & Moulds, 2016
 Heliopsalta Moulds, 2012
 Hilaphura Webb, 1979
 Huechys Amyot & Audinet-Serville, 1843
 Kanakia Distant, 1892
 Kikihia Dugdale, 1972
 Kobonga Distant, 1906
 Kosemia Matsumura, 1927
 Limnopsalta Moulds, 2012
 Linguacicada Chou & Lu, 1997
 Maoricicada Dugdale, 1972
 Marteena Moulds, 1986
 Melampsalta Kolenati, 1857
 Melanesiana Delorme, 2017
 Mouia Distant, 1920
 Mugadina Moulds, 2012
 Murmurillana Delorme, 2016
 Myersalna Boulard, 1988
 Myopsalta Moulds, 2012
 Nanopsalta Moulds, 2012
 Neopunia Moulds, 2012
 Nigripsaltria Boer, 1999
 Noongara Moulds, 2012
 Notopsalta Dugdale, 1972
 Oligoglena Horvath, 1912
 Pakidetta Sanborn & Ahmed, 2017
 Palapsalta Moulds, 2012
 Panialna Delorme, 2016
 Paradina Moulds, 2012
 Parvittya Distant, 1905
 Paulaudalna Delorme, 2017
 Pauropsalta Goding & Froggatt, 1904
 Philipsalta Lee, Marshall & Hill, 2016
 Physeema Moulds, 2012
 Pinheya Dlabola, 1963
 Pipilopsalta Ewart, 2005
 Platypsalta Moulds, 2012
 Plerapsalta Moulds, 2012
 Popplepsalta Owen & Moulds, 2016
 Poviliana Boulard, 1997
 Pseudokanakia Delorme, 2016
 Pseudotettigetta Puissant, 2010
 Punia Moulds, 2012
 Pyropsalta Moulds, 2012
 Relictapsalta Owen & Moulds, 2016
 Rhodopsalta Dugdale, 1972
 Rouxalna Boulard, 1999
 Samaecicada Popple & Emery, 2010
 Saticula Stål, 1866
 Scieroptera Stål, 1866
 Scolopita Chou & Lei, 1997
 Simona Moulds, 2012
 Stellenboschia Distant, 1920
 Strepuntalna Delorme, 2017
 Sylphoides Moulds, 2012
 Takapsalta Matsumura, 1927
 Taurella Moulds, 2012
 Telmapsalta Moulds, 2012
 Terepsalta Moulds, 2012
 Tettigetta Kolenati, 1857
 Tettigettacula Puissant, 2010
 Tettigettalna Puissant, 2010
 Tettigettula Puissant, 2010
 Tibeta Lei & Chou, 1997
 Toxala Moulds, 2012
 Toxopeusella Schmidt, 1926
 Tympanistalna Boulard, 1982
 Ueana Distant, 1905
 Urabunana Distant, 1905
 Uradolichos Moulds, 2012
 Vastarena Delorme, 2016
 Xossarella Boulard, 1980
 Yoyetta Moulds, 2012

References

Cicadettini